1907 in philosophy

Events

Publications 
 Hastings Rashdall, The Theory of Good and Evil
 Henri Bergson, L’Évolution créatrice

Births 
 July 18 - H. L. A. Hart, English legal philosopher (died 1992)
 November 30 - Jacques Barzun, French-born historian (died 2012)

Deaths

References 

Philosophy
20th-century philosophy
Philosophy by year